Below is a list of composers of lute music, ordered by nationality.

Bohemia
 Johann Anton Logy (1650–1721)

France

 Guillaume de Morlaye (c.1510–c.1558)
 Adrian Le Roy (c.1520–1598)
 Julien Perrichon (1566–c.1600)
 Jean-Baptiste Besard (c.1567–after 1616)
 René Mesangeau (c. 1567–1638)
 Robert Ballard (c.1572–after 1650)
 Ennemond Gaultier (c.1575–1651)
 Denis Gaultier (c.1597–1672)
 Pierre Gaultier (c.1599–?)
 François de Chancy (1600–1656)
 Jacques Gaultier (c.1600–1652)
 François Dufault (c.1604–c.1672)
 Charles Fleury (c.1605–1652)
 Jacques de Saint-Luc (1616– c.1710)
 Charles Mouton (1617–before 1699)
 Jacques Gallot (c.1625–c.1695)
 Robert de Visée (1650–1725)

Germany

 Hans Judenkönig (c.1450–1526)
 Hans Gerle (c.1500–1570)
 Hans Neusidler (c.1508–1563)
 Elias Mertel (c.1561–1626)
 Johann Daniel Mylius (c.1583–1642)
 Philipp Stolle (1614–1675)
 Esaias Reusner (1636–1679)
 Johann Krieger (1651–1735)
 Georg Böhm (1661–1733)
 David Kellner (1670–1747)
 Sylvius Leopold Weiss (1687–1750)
 Ernst Gottlieb Baron (1696–1760)
 Adam Falckenhagen (1697–1761)
 Johann Kropfgans (1708–c.1770)
 Bernhard Joachim Hagen (1720–1787)

Hungary
 Bálint Bakfark (1507–1576)

Italy

 Vincenzo Capirola (1474–after 1548)
 Santino Garsi da Parma (1542–1604)
 Simone Molinaro (1565–1615)
 Alfonso Ferrabosco (I) (1575–1628)
 Michelagnolo Galilei (1575–1631)
 Ludovico Roncalli (1600?)
 Francesco Corbetta (1612–1681)
 Giovanni Battista Granata (1620/21–1687)
 Tomaso Giovanni Albinoni (1671–1751)
 Antonio Vivaldi (1678–1741)
 Domenico Scarlatti (1685–1757)
 Benedetto Marcello (1686–1739)
 Giuseppe Antonio Brescianello (1690–1758)
 Pietro Locatelli (1695–1764)
 Giovanni Benedetto Platti (1697–1763)

Netherlands
 Joachim van den Hove (1567–1620)

Spain

 Enríquez de Valderrábano (1500–1557)
 Luis de Milán (1500–1561)
 Miguel de Fuenllana (1500?–1579)
 Alonso de Mudarra (1508–1580)
 Diego Pisador (1509–1557)
 Luis de Narváez (1510–1555)
 Antonio de Cabezón (1510–1566)
 Tomás de Santa María (1510–1570)
 Esteban Daza (c.1537–1591/6)
 Lucas Ruiz de Ribayaz (1626–after 1677)
 Gaspar Sanz (1640–1710)
 Juan Bautista Cabanilles (1644–1712)
 Francisco Guerau (1649–1717/22)

Sweden
 Johan Helmich Roman (1694–1758)

External links
CGCL Classical Guitar Composers List (CGCL) Homepage

Lute, nationality